The Lanarkshire Tramways was a tramway between Hamilton, Motherwell, and Wishaw from 1903 to 1931.

History

The tramway was authorised by the Hamilton, Motherwell and Wishaw Tramways Act of 1900. Services started on 22 July 1903, the company taking the shorter name, Lanarkshire Tramways.

An extension was opened on 20 January 1907 which provided a connection with Glasgow Corporation Tramways.

Closure

The tramway ceased operation on 14 February 1931, the company having changed its name the previous year to the Lanarkshire Traction Company.

One tram survived into preservation, No 53, and is currently at the Summerlee, Museum of Scottish Industrial Life.

References

External links
 Lanarkshire Tramways Company at British Tramway Company Badges and Buttons

1874 establishments in Scotland
Tram transport in Scotland
4 ft 7¾ in gauge railways in Scotland
Transport companies established in 1874
British companies established in 1874